Amy Renee Heidemann Noonan (born April 29, 1986), known professionally as Qveen Herby, is an American rapper, singer, songwriter and entrepreneur. Born and raised in Seward, Nebraska, she first gained fame as part of the music duo Karmin, with which she released two studio albums. Following the duo's hiatus in 2017, she began the solo project, Qveen Herby, which incorporated R&B and hip hop influences. She released her first solo extended play, EP 1 on June 2, 2017. She released her debut album, A Woman on May 21, 2021.

After the release of EP 1 and EP 2, Herby began to release a series of extended plays. EP 3 and EP 4 were released in 2018; with EP 5, EP 6, and EP 7 being out in 2019. In 2020, Herby revealed that EP 8 and EP 9 was considered to be the last EPs from her extended play era. On Halloween 2021, Qveen Herby released a Halloween-themed EP called, Halloqveen. The following April, she revealed another EP called Mad Qveen, and another named The Muse the following February.

Career

2010–2016: Rising as Karmin 
Heidemann began her musical career as a member of pop duo Karmin, with now-husband Nick Noonan, releasing cover songs on YouTube. The duo signed with Epic Records and released their debut EP, Hello, on May 7, 2012, to poor reviews from critics; despite this, the EP was a commercial success supplemented by two hit singles: "Brokenhearted" peaked at number 16 on Billboard Hot 100 charts, and peaked within the top ten of the charts in Australia, New Zealand, and the United Kingdom, while "Hello" peaked at number one on the Billboard Hot Dance Club Songs charts in the United States.

The duo followed Hello up by their debut full-length studio album, Pulses (2014), which saw less commercial success, and was supplemented by the single "Acapella". "Acapella" reached the top ten in Australia and New Zealand. Following the conclusion of promotion for Pulses, Karmin left Epic Records and began releasing music independently. They released a slew of singles from 2014 to 2016 in anticipation of a second studio album. These included "Sugar", "Yesterday", "Along the Road", "Didn't Know You", and "Come with Me (Pure Imagination)".  In 2016, Karmin released the Sugar EP in collaboration with Wild Culture. It features three remixes of "Sugar" and a remix of Riley Pearce's single "Brave". The duo released their second studio album, Leo Rising, on September 9, 2016.

2017–2020: Long Live the Qveen 
In 2017, all of Karmin's social media was rebranded to Qveen Herby with a small preview stating "Karmin Is Dead, Long Live the Qveen." Heidemann formally announced her solo career as well as her debut extended play, EP 1. Although her husband, Nick Noonan, was still involved in the project, Heidemann noted that they felt that they could not release the extended play as Karmin as "There was that much happening sonically." Heidemann picked her stage name by combining "Qveen" a nickname given to her in college alongside "Herby" the mascot of the Nebraska Cornhuskers, later realizing that "Herby" means "Warrior".

The music video for her first single "Busta Rhymes" was released on June 1, 2017, followed by the release of EP 1 a day later. The EP experienced fair success, peaking at No. 37 on the US Billboard Independent Albums Chart and No. 13 on the US Heatseekers Albums Chart.

After the release of EP 1, Herby released her second extended play, EP 2, on December 1, 2017. Around the release of EP 2, Herby and DJ Audrey Napoleon launched their cosmetic business Qveen Studios with the makeup line inspired by songs on Qveen Herby's discography.

Following the release of EP 1 and EP 2, Herby began releasing a series of extended plays. Starting with EP 3 and EP 4 released in 2018. EP 5, EP 6, and EP 7 being released in 2019. She has also released a live EP and a single album, The Vignettes and Tiny Piano.

And lastly, EP 8 and EP 9 out in 2020. Three of the EPs charted within Billboard charts in the US. Throughout in 2020, Herby revealed that EP 9 was considered to be the last EP. After the end of her EP era (in 2020), she began releasing droplets such as, "Alright" and "The Show", until the year was over.

2021–present: A Woman 
On April 16, 2021, Qveen Herby released "Juice" the lead single for her debut album. Herby announced the debut album title, named A Woman, and the release date on April 27, 2021. Herby eventually released her debut album on May 21, 2021, along with a second single and a music video named, "Naughty Girl". In early October, Qveen Herby revealed that a Halloween-themed EP was in works with a celebration.

On October 15, 2021, Qveen Herby released the Halloween-themed EP named, Halloqveen. Later on, she revealed a date for her EP's release party which took place in Downtown Los Angeles on October 23.

In March 2022, Qveen Herby announced on Instagram a new EP named MAD QVEEN, which was released on April 1 through her own record label Checkbook Records. The EP included 7 tracks such as  "Rabbit Hole" and "Cruella".

On October 11, 2022, Qveen Herby released her first double single  "5D", which includes her latest singles, "5D" and "DRESS CODE ".

On February 14, 2023, Qveen Herby released her album THE MUSE via Checkbook Records which she teased on TikTok and Instagram. The Qveen officially announced the release on her House of Herby podcast on S2 E1, January 26th, 2023. The tracklist was released on Instagram January 31, 2023 letting fans know the double single "5D" and "DRESS CODE" was the first official single. She held a release party at her residence on February 13th to celebrate the midnight release.

Discography

Studio album

Compilation album

Extended plays

Singles

As featuring artist

Promotional singles

Other appearances

Music videos

Accolades

Filmography

Film

Music video

References

External links
 
 
 

1986 births
Living people
21st-century American rappers
American hip hop singers
American women hip hop singers
American contemporary R&B singers
21st-century American women singers
American women songwriters
American songwriters
Songwriters from Nebraska
American women rappers
American people of German descent
Rappers from Los Angeles
Songwriters from California
Pop rappers
Berklee College of Music alumni
21st-century American singers
People from Seward, Nebraska
Rappers from Nebraska
Singers from Los Angeles
Singers from Nebraska
Rappers from Boston
21st-century women rappers